Roy Merrill Joiner (October 30, 1906 – December 26, 1989), nicknamed "Pop", was a professional baseball player who played pitcher in the Major Leagues from 1934 to 1940. He played for the Chicago Cubs and New York Giants. Joiner was involved in a multi-player fight during the 1935 season resulting in the only ejection of his Major League Baseball (MLB) career.

Born in Red Bluff, California, Joiner later died in the same city on December 26, 1989.

References

External links

1906 births
1989 deaths
Chicago Cubs players
New York Giants (NL) players
Major League Baseball pitchers
Baseball players from California
San Francisco Seals (baseball) players
Oakland Oaks (baseball) players
Omaha Packers players
Los Angeles Angels (minor league) players
Birmingham Barons players
Jersey City Giants players
Hollywood Stars players
Bakersfield Bees players